The 2019–20 Ukrainian Cup  was the 29th annual season of Ukraine's football knockout competition. The competition started on 20 August 2019 and concluded on 8 July 2020 with the final at the OSC Metalist in Kharkiv.

All competition rounds consisted of a single game with a home field advantage granted to a team from lower league. Qualification for the competition is granted to all professional clubs and finalists of the Ukrainian Amateur Cup as long as those clubs are able to pass the season's attestation (licensing).

Shakhtar Donetsk was the defending winner for the last two seasons, but was eliminated by Dynamo Kyiv in the round of 16. The Donetsk club has reached the competition finals in the last nine years winning seven of them.

Dynamo Kyiv won their 12th Ukrainian Cup title after beating Vorskla Poltava 8–7 on penalties in the final with the game ending in the 1–1 draw. They therefore qualified to the group stage of the 2020–21 UEFA Europa League, however they can still qualify for the Champions League through league season.

Some changes were introduced. Unlike the last season starting with the third round of the competition there was a seeded draw, while for the first two rounds the draw remained blind. This was the first Ukrainian Cup season to implement the Video assistant referee (VAR) system on some matches, the first game to use VAR was the quarter-final match between Dynamo Kyiv and Oleksandriya.

On 17 March 2020, the Ukrainian Association of Football made a decision to pause all football competitions in the country on 18 March 2020 for an unspecified period of time (until the decision to resume competitions) due to the COVID-19 pandemic in Ukraine, which caused a postponement of the semi-final and final matches to another date.

Team allocation and schedule 
The competition included all professional first teams from the Premier League (12/12 teams of the league), First League (16/16), Second League (18/22) and two best teams from the previous year's Amateur Cup. Four second club teams from the Second League are not eligible for the tournament.

One more team, Arsenal Kyiv, withdrew right after approval of the tournament structure, but before the draw of the second preliminary round, to which it qualified as a member of the First League.

Rounds schedule 

Notes:
All draws were held at the Ukrainian Association of Football House of Football.

Competition schedule

First Preliminary round (1/64) 
In this round eighteen clubs from the Second League and both finalists of the 2018–19 Ukrainian Amateur Cup are scheduled to play. The draw for this round was to be held on 26 July 2019 at the House of Football in Kyiv. The round matches initially were to be played on 7 August 2019. However, on 26 July 2019 it was announced that draw was postponed due to recent changes in leagues composition (withdrawal of Arsenal Kyiv) and conflict with FC Peremoha, the draw was postponed. The draw was finally held on 14 August 2019 with the matches played on 20 August 2019.

Notes:
 SC Tavriya Simferopol is forced to play outside of Simferopol due to ongoing the 2014 Russo-Ukrainian War.
 Other teams of NK Veres Rivne, FC Alians Lypova Dolyna, and FC Avanhard Bziv were hosting their opponents on neutral fields as their home turf for various reasons are not available.

Second Preliminary round (1/32) 
In this round 15 clubs will enter from the First League and 10 winners of the previous round (9 clubs from the Second League and 1 amateur club). Due to odd number of teams, one of them received a bye. The draw for this round was held 21 August 2019 at the House of Football in Kyiv. The round matches were played on 27 August 2019.

Notes:
 Ahrobiznes was drawn with a bye berth that became available as a result of withdrawal of Arsenal Kyiv (the Kyivan club officially withdrew on 22 July 2019, a month before the draw, yet was considered for the Ukrainian cup competition by the Ukrainian Association of Football.). After its withdrawal, Arsenal Kyiv was replaced with Metalurh Zaporizhya that during the draw recognized as part of the First League.
 Match played at Central City Stadium (upper field), Mykolaiv
 Match played at Sonyachnyi Stadium, Kharkiv
 Match played at Yuvileinyi Stadium, Sumy (Alians uses the stadium as home field for the season instead of own Alians Arena in Romny Raion)
 Tavriya Simferopol is forced to play away from Simferopol due to the 2014 Russian occupation of Crimea. The match was played at Mashynobudivnyk Stadium, Beryslav
 Match played at Kolos Stadium, Mlyniv
 Match played at Avanhard Stadium (Bernadsky Garden), Kramatorsk

Third Preliminary round (1/16 finals) 
In this round 6 clubs will enter from the Premier League, 1 club from the First League (Chornomorets Odesa) and 13 winners of the previous round (10 clubs from the First League including one club with bye and 3 clubs from the Second League). The draw for this round was held 28 August 2019 at the House of Football in Kyiv. The round matches will be played on 25 September 2019. 

Notes:
 Match played at Lokomotyv Stadium, Poltava which is used as a home stadium by Kremin.
 Match played at Park Peremohy, Mykolaiv
 Match rescheduled to 2 October since Mariupol plays its rescheduled Round 4 Ukrainian Premier League game against Dynamo Kyiv.

Round of 16 (1/8 finals) 
In this round the remaining six clubs from the Premier League entered, and the ten winners of the previous round (five clubs from the Premier League, four clubs from the First League and one club from the Second League). The draw for this round was held on 3 October 2019 at the House of Football in Kyiv. The round matches will be played on 30 October 2019.

Quarter-finals 
This round consisted of 5 representatives from the Premier League, 2 teams from the First League, and one team from the Second League advanced to this round. Originally scheduled for 1 November 2019, the draw for this round was postponed for December. The draw for this round was held on 18 December 2019 at the House of Football in Kyiv. The round matches were scheduled to be played on 4 March 2020. On 14 February 2020 the UAF Executive Committee approved changes to the dates of the cup competition as well the Premier Liha. The quarterfinals games were shifted to 11 March 2020.

Semi-finals 
This round consisted of 3 representatives from the Premier League and a team from the First League. Originally the round matches were to be played on 22 April 2020, but later shifted to 15 April 2020. The draw for this round was held as announced on 13 March 2020 at the House of Football in Kyiv. The nominal host for final was identified at the draw for the Ukrainian Cup semifinals as the Mynai/Dynamo pair. The matches were later postponed due to the pause in all competitions in relation to the COVID-19 pandemic in Ukraine.

Final

The city of Ternopil (Ternopilsky Misky Stadion) was set to host its first Ukrainian Cup final and first major competition final overall. The match was originally planned to be held on 13 May 2020, but was later postponed due to the pause in all competitions in relation to the COVID-19 pandemic in Ukraine.

Bracket
The following is the bracket which the main stage of the Ukrainian Cup resembles. Numbers in parentheses next to the match score represent the results of a penalty shoot-out.

Top goalscorers 
The competition's top ten goalscorers including preliminary rounds.

Notes:

See also 
2019–20 Ukrainian Premier League
2019–20 Ukrainian First League
2019–20 Ukrainian Second League
2019–20 UEFA Europa League
2019–20 Ukrainian Amateur Cup

Notes

References

External links
 The 2019–20 Ukrainian Cup. The quarterfinals: official results (Кубок України-2019/2020. 1/4 фіналу: офіційні дані). Ukrainian Association of Football. 20 August 2019. (tournament main page with hyperlinks to each round, in Ukrainian)
 The 2019–20 Ukrainian Cup. RSSSF 
 The 2019–20 Ukrainian Cup. FootballFacts.ru 
 The 2019–20 Ukrainian Cup. UA Football.net.ua (by Dmitriy Troschiy in Russian)

Cup
Ukrainian Cup
Ukrainian Cup seasons
Ukrainian